Beardsley House may refer to:

Capt. Philo Beardsley House, Kent, Connecticut
Beardsley–Mix House, West Hartford, Connecticut
Dr. Havilah Beardsley House, Elkhart, Indiana
Ezra E. and Florence (Holmes) Beardsley House, Bronson Township, Michigan
Beardsley-Oliver House, Olean, New York